Jenfeld is a quarter of Hamburg, Germany in the Wandsbek borough.

Geography
Jenfeld borders the quarters of Billstedt, Rahlstedt, Tonndorf, and Marienthal. It also borders the town Barsbüttel in Schleswig-Holstein.

Politics
These are the results of Jenfeld in the Hamburg state election:

References 

Quarters of Hamburg
Harburg, Hamburg